The  is a B wheel arrangement two-axle diesel-hydraulic locomotive type operated by Japan Freight Railway (JR Freight) on shunting duties in Japan since March 2017.

Overview
The Class DB500 was developed to replace ageing Class DE10 diesel-hydraulic locomotives used for shunting duties at smaller freight terminals such as Shimonoseki in Yamaguchi Prefecture.

History
The Class DB500 entered service at Shimonoseki Freight Terminal from the start of the revised timetable on 4 March 2017.

Classification

The DB500 classification for this locomotive type is explained below.
 D: Diesel locomotive
 B: Two driving axles
 500: Diesel-hydraulic locomotive

References

Further reading

External links

 Hokuriku Heavy Industries website 

Diesel locomotives of Japan
DB500
B locomotives
1067 mm gauge locomotives of Japan
Railway locomotives introduced in 2017